Anastasios Charalambis (22 September 1862 – 11 March 1949) was a Greek Lieutenant General and interim Prime Minister of Greece for one day in 1922.

Life 
Anastasios Charalambis was born in Kalavryta on 22 September 1862. After studying in the Hellenic Military Academy, he was commissioned as 2nd Lieutenant of Cavalry on 25 July 1884. He was promoted to Lieutenant in 1888 and Captain in 1895, and fought in the Greco-Turkish War of 1897.

He was again promoted to Major in 1908, Lt. Colonel in 1910 and Colonel in 1913. During the Balkan Wars of 1912–1913, he served as Chief of Staff of the 1st Infantry Division in Macedonia, then of the 6th Infantry Division in the operations in Epirus, before returning to the 1st Division for the operations against Bulgaria in the Second Balkan War.

In 1914 he was placed as Chief of Staff to II Army Corps, and then as Director of the Artillery Bureau of the Ministry of Military Affairs. From 26 April to 19 May and from 22 May to 14 June 1917 he served as Minister of Military Affairs, and then from 26 June as Chief of the Army's Staff Service until November. In early 1918 he was placed in command of II Army Corps, and retired from the Army on 23 July 1918. He was promoted to Major General in 1917 and Lt. General in 1918.

Following the defeat against Turkey in Anatolia, the government of Petros Protopapadakis fell, Greece was plunged into a political crisis. A military revolt, led by Venizelist officers, erupted in September 1922, and demanded the resignation of King Constantine I and of Prime Minister Nikolaos Triantafyllakos. Their demands were met, and the revolutionary committee installed a new government, with Alexandros Zaimis as Prime Minister and Charalambis as Minister of Military Affairs. As Zaimis was out of the country, Sotirios Krokidas was appointed as interim Prime Minister. 

Until Krokidas could reach Athens to be sworn in, Charalambis was sworn in as temporary Prime Minister and Minister for Military Affairs on 16 September, serving for one day (and concurrently also as provisional Interior Minister). After Krokidas arrived, he assumed the posts of Prime Minister and Interior Minister, while Charalambis remained Minister for Military Affairs until the cabinet's resignation on 14 November 1922.

He was recalled from retirement in 1927 to serve as chairman of the military council for the re-admission of officers purged for political reasons over the previous years. Charalambis died on 11 March 1949.

References

|-

|-

1862 births
1949 deaths
20th-century prime ministers of Greece
20th-century Greek military personnel
People from Kalavryta
Prime Ministers of Greece
Hellenic Army lieutenant generals
Greek military personnel of the Greco-Turkish War (1897)
Greek military personnel of the Balkan Wars
Ministers of Military Affairs of Greece
Chiefs of the Hellenic Army General Staff
Ministers of the Interior of Greece